The list of closed railway stations in Britain includes the year of closure if known.  Stations reopened as heritage railways continue to be included in this list and some have been linked.  Some stations have been reopened to passenger traffic.  Some lines are still in use for freight and mineral traffic.

Lists
List of closed railway stations in London
Closed London Underground stations
List of closed railway stations in Greater Manchester
List of closed railway stations in Lancashire

List of closed railway stations in Norfolk
List of closed railway stations in the West Midlands

See also
 Connecting Communities: Expanding Access to the Rail Network, a 2009 report from ATOC detailing 40 commercially viable sites in England for new or reopened stations

Further reading

External links 
 Extensive list of closed station sites at Subterranea Britannica
 Lost railways of West Yorkshire 
 Chronologies and line charts for Scottish railways
 Disused lines and stations in London, Wales, and England

Closed, Britain
Closed railway stations in Britain